The ileocolic artery is the lowest branch arising from the concavity of the superior mesenteric artery. It supplies the cecum, ileum, and appendix.

It passes downward and to the right behind the peritoneum toward the right iliac fossa, where it divides into a superior and an inferior branch: the inferior gives rise to the appendicular artery and anastomoses with the end of the superior mesenteric artery; the superior branch anastomoses with the right colic artery.

Anatomy

Branches 
The inferior branch of the ileocolic runs toward the upper border of the ileocolic junction and produces the following branches:
 colic branch of ileocolic artery, which passes upward on the ascending colon - from the posterior branch of the inferior branch of the ileocolic artery
 ileocecal (some sources acknowledge this division  while others do not)
 anterior cecal artery and posterior cecal artery, which are distributed to the front and back of the cecum
 ileal branch of ileocolic artery, which runs upward and to the left on the lower part of the ileum and anastomoses with the termination of the superior mesenteric artery
 an appendicular artery

Additional images

References

External links
  - "Intestines and Pancreas: Branches of Superior Mesenteric Artery"
 
 

Arteries of the abdomen